Elaphidion spinicorne is a species of beetle in the family Cerambycidae. It was described by Dru Drury in 1773 from Jamaica.

Description
Head clay coloured. Antennae red brown, about as long as the insect, each joint having two spines, except that next to the head. Thorax clay coloured and cylindrical, without spines; having a small red-brown streak extending along the middle and down the head. Scutellum triangular. Elytra clay coloured, with many small red-brown streaks crossing them; margined on the sides and suture, each having two spines at its extremity. Abdomen and breast greyish clay coloured, with a small red-brown spot on each side of each of the segments. Legs red brown, having a strong spine at the tip of each of the femora, except the fore ones, and another at the tips of each of the tibiae. Length of body slightly less than 1 inch (21 mm).

References

spinicorne
Beetles described in 1773
Descriptions from Illustrations of Exotic Entomology
Taxa named by Dru Drury